GnuCOBOL (formerly OpenCOBOL, and for a short time known as GNU Cobol) is a free implementation of the COBOL programming language. GnuCOBOL is a transcompiler to C which uses a native C compiler. Originally designed by Keisuke Nishida, the lead development was taken up by Roger While. The most recent developments are now led by Simon Sobisch, Ron Norman, Edward Hart, Sergey Kashyrin and many others.

History
While working with Rildo Pragana on TinyCOBOL, Keisuke decided to attempt a COBOL compiler suitable for integration with gcc. This soon became the OpenCOBOL project. Keisuke worked as the lead developer until 2005 and version 0.31. Roger then took over as lead and released OpenCOBOL 1.0 on 27 December 2007. Work on the OpenCOBOL 1.1 pre-release continued until February 2009. In May 2012, active development was moved to SourceForge, and the pre-release of February 2009 was marked as a release. In late September 2013, OpenCOBOL was accepted as a GNU Project, renamed to GNU Cobol, and then finally to GnuCOBOL in September 2014.  Ron Norman has added a Report Writer module as a branch of GnuCobol 2.0, and Sergey Kashyrin has developed a version that uses C++ intermediates instead of C.

Latest current release is now v3.1 Final, issued 7 July 2020.

Transfer of copyrights to the Free Software Foundation over GnuCOBOL source code (including versions with GNU Cobol and OpenCOBOL spellings) was finalized on 17 June 2015.

Philosophy

While striving to keep in line with COBOL Standards up to the current COBOL 2014 specification, and also to include features common in existing compilers, the developers do not claim any level of standards conformance. Even so, the 2.2 final release passes over 9,688 (99.79%) of the tests included in the NIST COBOL 85 test suite, out of 9,708 (as 20 are deleted). 

GnuCOBOL translates a COBOL program (source code) into a C program. The C program can then be compiled into the actual code used by the computer (object code) or into a library where other programs can call (link to) it. Under UNIX and similar operating systems (such as Linux), the GNU C compiler is used. For Windows, Microsoft’s Visual Studio Express package provides the C compiler. The two step compilation is usually performed by a single command, but an option exists to allow the programmer to stop compilation after the C code has been generated.

Documentation
The opencobol.org site was the official home of the development team from 2002 until 2012, and was the best source of upstream development information. However, all recent developments are now taking place within a SourceForge project space at GnuCOBOL.

The GnuCOBOL Programmer's Guide, by Gary Cutler, was published under the GNU Free Documentation License.
It has been updated to include GnuCOBOL with Report Writer and is listed in the GnuCOBOL documentation overview page with latest versions in the code tree. It is maintained by Vincent Coen, James K. Lowden and others as each new compiler version is issued and is available at GnuCOBOL - GNU Project.

Example programs

Historical
000100* HELLO.COB GnuCOBOL example
000200 IDENTIFICATION DIVISION.
000300 PROGRAM-ID. hello.
000400 PROCEDURE DIVISION.
000500     DISPLAY "Hello, world!".
000600     STOP RUN.
Compilation and execution:
$ cobc -x HELLO.COB
$ ./HELLO
Hello, world!

Modern, free format
*> GnuCOBOL Hello World example
id division.
program-id. hello.
procedure division.
display "Hello, world!" end-display
goback.
Compilation and execution:
$ cobc -x -free hello.cob
$ ./hello
Hello, world!

Shortest
The shortest valid COBOL program, with the relaxed syntax option in GnuCOBOL 2.0, is a blank file. Compilation and execution:
$ cobc -x -frelax-syntax ./empty.cob
./empty.cob: 1: Warning: PROGRAM-ID header missing - assumed
$ ./empty
$ 
For earlier versions and with relaxed syntax:
display"Hello, world!".
Compilation and execution:
$ cobc -x -frelax-syntax -free hello.cob
hello.cob: 1: Warning: PROGRAM-ID header missing - assumed
hello.cob: 1: Warning: PROCEDURE DIVISION header missing - assumed
$ ./hello
Hello, world!
Without relaxed syntax and with any version of GnuCOBOL, GNU Cobol or OpenCOBOL. (Note, there are 7 leading spaces to conform to FIXED layout COBOL source):
       program-id.h.procedure division.display "Hello, world!".
Compilation occurs without errors:
$ cobc -x smallest.cob
$ ./smallest
Hello, world!
Please note that these trivia listings are not to be regarded as good COBOL form; COBOL was designed to be a readable English programming language.

Implementation
The parser and lexical scanner use Bison and Flex. The GPL licensed compiler and LGPL licensed run-time libraries are written in C and use the C ABI for external program linkage.

Build packaging uses the GNU Build System. Standard tests with make check use Autoconf, ANSI85 testsuite run by make test use Perl scripts.

The configure script that sets up the GnuCOBOL compile has options that include:

 choice of C compiler and its options for post translation compilation
 database management system for ISAM support
 inclusion of iconv

Availability
1.0 release from SourceForge.
1.1 release from SourceForge
2.0 development release from SourceForge
open-cobol Debian package.
2.2 Final, released 7 September 2017 from SourceForge
2.2 Documentation, released September 2017 from the SourceForge Code Tree.
3.1 Released July 2020 along with the documentation.

References

External links
GNU site, official releases of GnuCOBOL

Open Source COBOL Consortium in Japan
GnuCOBOL FAQ
Add1ToCOBOL Open Source Cobol and OpenCOBOL advocacy site

COBOL
Compilers
Free compilers and interpreters
GNU Project software